Veliuona is a small town on the Nemunas River in the Jurbarkas district municipality in Lithuania.

History
Veliuona (also known as Junigeda) was first mentioned in 1291 in the chronicle of Peter of Duisburg.
The town is primarily known as the burial place of Gediminas.
An old church, founded by Vytautas the Great in 1421, was rebuilt and enlarged in 1636.
In 1501–1506 m. Veliuona was granted Magdeburg rights by  the Grand Duke of Lithuania and King of Poland Alexander Jagiellon. In the 18th century Veliuona belonged to prince Józef Poniatowski, in the 19th century to the Zalewski family.
In July 1941, an Einsatzgruppen of German and Lithuanian nationalists murdered dozens of Jews from the town in mass executions.

Gallery

References
 Veliuona, 2001, Versme, 1176 p.

External links
 Велона — Velona

Towns in Lithuania
Towns in Tauragė County
Duchy of Samogitia
Kovensky Uyezd
Holocaust locations in Lithuania